Daniel Rigby (born 6 December 1982) is an English actor and comedian. He received a BAFTA TV Award for his leading role as Eric Morecambe in the 2011 television film Eric and Ernie.

Early life
Rigby was born in Stockport, Greater Manchester. He attended Cheadle Hulme School and then studied performing arts at Stockport College. He then enrolled at the Royal Academy of Dramatic Art.

Career
Rigby has worked as a stand-up comedian, having appeared at the Latitude Festival, won the 2007 Laughing Horse New Act of the Year, and been a nominee for winner of the 2007 So You Think You're Funny competition. In 2007, he moved to television roles with the BBC period drama Lilies. In 2011, Rigby won the BAFTA for Best Actor for his performance as late comedian Eric Morecambe in Eric and Ernie, beating both Matt Smith and Benedict Cumberbatch for their roles as the Doctor and Sherlock Holmes. From 2011 until 2014 Rigby voiced Copenhagen in three Series of the BBC Radio 4 comedy Warhorses of Letters alongside Stephen Fry. He performed in Tom Basden's Holes at the Arcola Theatre in London from 16 July to 9 August 2014 alongside Mathew Baynton.

In 2015 he narrated the reboot of the BBC children's television series Teletubbies. In March 2017 he won the best actor award at the Manchester Theatre Awards for his performance as Alan Turing in Breaking the Code at the Royal Exchange, Manchester.

In 2019 he voiced the title role in the Radio 4 sitcom ReincarNathan, alongside Diane Morgan and Josh Widdicombe.

In 2021 Rigby wrote and performed the highly rated audiobook novel Isaac Steele and the Forever Man.

Filmography

Film

Television

Stage

References

External links
 
 
 Daniel Rigby - full credits at pbjmanagement
 , from BAFTAguru

1982 births
Living people
Alumni of RADA
Best Actor BAFTA Award (television) winners
English stand-up comedians
Place of birth missing (living people)
People educated at Cheadle Hulme School
English male film actors
English male television actors
English male stage actors
21st-century English male actors